Rhytidochrotinae is a subfamily of grasshoppers from the family Acrididae with 20 genera and 47 species. This group is found from southern Central America to northern South America (Costa Rica to Brazil) with most species distributed in montane forests. The highest concentration of species are found on the Pacific coast and in the West Andes of Colombia with 11 genera and 23 species registered. Many are brightly colored in reds, especially males, and most species are apterous (without wings).

"Rhytido" is derived from the Greek word rhytis, which means "wrinkle".

Genera

Brakeracris varablancensis Rowell, 1995: 1 species; Costa Rica
Chiriquacris quadrimaculata Rowell & Bentos-Pereira, 2005: 1 species; Panama
Driphilacris tuberosa Descamps & Amédégnato, 1972: 1 species; Western Colombia
Exerythracris volcanica Rowell, 1995: 1 species; Costa Rica
Galidacris Descamps & Amédégnato, 1972: 4 species; Colombia
Hylopedetes Rehn, 1929: 7 species; Costa Rica, Panama and Colombia
Lathacris rubriventris Descamps & Amédégnato, 1972: 1 species; Southeastern Brazil
Liparacris anchicaya Descamps & Amédégnato, 1972: 1 species; Western Colombia
Micropaon lucens Descamps & Rowell, 1984: 1 species; Costa Rica
Muyscacris panchlora Hebard, 1923: 1 species; Colombia
Oedalacris Descamps & Amédégnato, 1972: 5 species; Panama and Colombia
Opaon Kirby, 1902: 4 species; Colombia and Ecuador
Opaonella tenuis Hebard, 1923: 1 species; Colombia
Parapiezops Hebard, 1923: 2 species; Colombia
Paropaon Hebard, 1923: 2 species; Colombia, Ecuador and Peru
Piezops ensicornis Hebard, 1923: 1 species; Panama and Colombia 
Rhytidochrota Stål, 1873: 7 species; 6 species in Colombia, 1 species in Bolivia
Scirtopaon dorsatus Descamps & Rowell, 1984: 1 species; Costa Rica
Talamancacris palustris Rowell, 1995: 1 species; Costa Rica
Trichopaon Descamps & Amédégnato, 1972: 4 species; 3 species in Colombia 1 species in Ecuador

References

External links 
 
 Rhytidochrotinae en Biolib

Acrididae
Orthoptera subfamilies
Taxa named by Carl Brunner von Wattenwyl